Cryptolechia fustiformis is a moth in the family Depressariidae. It was described by Wang in 2006. It is found in Zhejiang, China.

The length of the forewings is 13–13.5 mm. The forewings are brown, but yellow along the apex and termen and the costal margin with a yellowish spot beyond the middle and at the distal one-fifth. There is a single dark dot at the middle, at the end of the cell and near the end of the fold. The hindwings are grey.

Etymology
The species name refers to the shape of the uncus in the male genitalia and is derived from Latin fustiformis (meaning sticklike).

References

Moths described in 2006
Cryptolechia (moth)